Bulolia is a genus of Papuan jumping spiders that was first described by Marek Michał Żabka in 1996.  it contains only two species, found only in Papua New Guinea: B. excentrica and B. ocellata.

References

Further reading
 

Arthropods of New Guinea
Salticidae
Salticidae genera
Spiders of Oceania